Dolichopeza is a genus of true crane fly. It is the only genus in the subfamily Dolichopezinae.

Species
Subgenus Afrodolichopeza Alexander, 1956
D. altivaga Alexander, 1956
D. anitra Alexander, 1956
D. fidens Alexander, 1956
D. marlieri Alexander, 1956
Subgenus Dolichopeza Curtis, 1825
D. aequalis Theischinger, 1993
D. albescens Alexander, 1937
D. albipes (Strom, 1768)
D. americana Needham, 1908
D. annulipes Skuse, 1890
D. anthema Alexander, 1971
D. asymmetrica Theischinger, 1993
D. atropos (Hudson, 1895)
D. austrocaledonica Alexander, 1948
D. ballaratiensis Dobrotworsky, 1974
D. berrimilla Theischinger, 1993
D. bibasis Alexander, 1971
D. bickeli Theischinger, 1993
D. boogoo Theischinger, 1993
D. borealis Byers, 1961
D. brevifurca Skuse, 1890
D. cairnensis Alexander, 1934
D. cinerea (Macquart, 1846)
D. collessi Theischinger, 1993
D. corinnaiensis Dobrotworsky, 1974
D. corybantes Alexander, 1956
D. cuthbertsoniana Alexander, 1945
D. cyatheti Alexander, 1934
D. danbulla Theischinger, 1993
D. davidsoni Alexander, 1930
D. directa Theischinger, 1993
D. distigma (Speiser, 1909)
D. distivena Alexander, 1971
D. dorrigensis Alexander, 1930
D. dyura Theischinger, 2000
D. fenwicki Alexander, 1923
D. ferox Alexander, 1928
D. flavomarginata (Riedel, 1914)
D. fuscipes Bergroth, 1889
D. gaba Theischinger, 2000
D. geometrica Theischinger, 1993
D. graeca Mannheims, 1954
D. hirsuticauda Savchenko, 1968
D. hispanica Mannheims, 1951
D. honshiuensis Alexander, 1938
D. howesi Alexander, 1922
D. illingworthi Alexander, 1930
D. issikiella Alexander, 1934
D. katoi Alexander, 1938
D. kongoola Theischinger, 1993
D. kurandensis Alexander, 1937
D. leonardi Theischinger, 1993
D. longifurca Skuse, 1890
D. minnamurra Theischinger, 1993
D. mongas Alexander, 1971
D. monticola Skuse, 1890
D. nephalia Alexander, 1948
D. nigrina Dobrotworsky, 1974
D. nitida Mik, 1874
D. niveitarsis Skuse, 1890
D. nokensis Alexander, 1948
D. oresitropha Alexander, 1928
D. palliditarsis Alexander, 1928
D. pallidula Alexander, 1928
D. parvicauda Edwards, 1923
D. percuneata Alexander, 1936
D. planidigitalis Skuse, 1890
D. pygmaea Alexander, 1928
D. queenslandica Alexander, 1920
D. schahriari Theowald, 1978
D. segnis Alexander, 1937
D. setistyla Alexander, 1971
D. spetai Theischinger, 1993
D. subannulipes Alexander, 1934
D. subposticata Alexander, 1928
D. tayloriana Alexander, 1936
D. thiasus Alexander, 1971
D. thowla Theischinger, 1993
D. thysbe Alexander, 1948
D. tropica Theischinger, 1993
D. tyilye Theischinger, 1993
D. umbacki Theischinger, 2000
D. varipes Skuse, 1890
D. victoriae Alexander, 1928
D. wuda Theischinger, 2000
D. yourula Theischinger, 1993
D. zborowskii Theischinger, 1999
D. zenta Theischinger, 1993
Subgenus Eudolichopeza Alexander, 1956
D. lipophleps Alexander, 1956
Subgenus Eunesopeza Alexander, 1934
D. defecta Edwards, 1933
D. epiphragmoides Edwards, 1933
Subgenus Megistomastix Alexander, 1912
D. acutiloba Alexander, 1937
D. borinquenia Alexander, 1969
D. cubensis (Alexander, 1928)
D. darlingtoni Alexander, 1939
D. devexa Alexander, 1937
D. domingensis Alexander, 1939
D. jenaro Alexander, 1969
D. multifila Alexander, 1969
D. obtusiloba Alexander, 1937
D. polytricha Alexander, 1969
D. portoricensis (Alexander, 1912)
D. prattiana Alexander, 1969
D. vittinervis Alexander, 1937
Subgenus Mitopeza Edwards, 1916
D. amisca Alexander, 1962
D. corinna Alexander, 1950
D. crassistyla Alexander, 1967
D. cuneiformis Edwards, 1932
D. flavicans (Edwards, 1927)
D. kanagaraji Alexander, 1952
D. longicornis (Brunetti, 1918)
D. mjobergi (Edwards, 1926)
D. nigromaculata (Edwards, 1928)
D. nitidirostris (Edwards, 1916)
D. rizalensis Alexander, 1931
D. taiwanicola Alexander, 1934
D. trichochora Alexander, 1974
Subgenus Nesopeza Alexander, 1914
D. abdita Alexander, 1932
D. adela Alexander, 1949
D. albitibia (Alexander, 1922)
D. angustaxillaris (Alexander, 1930)
D. angustissima Alexander, 1960
D. annulitarsis (Alexander, 1930)
D. aphotisma Alexander, 1963
D. aquila Alexander, 1963
D. asura Alexander, 1968
D. bagobo Alexander, 1931
D. ballator Alexander, 1962
D. basistylata (Alexander, 1929)
D. bicornigera Alexander, 1932
D. borneensis (Edwards, 1926)
D. caloptera (Edwards, 1931)
D. capitella Alexander, 1968
D. capnora (Alexander, 1927)
D. cinctitarsis (Alexander, 1927)
D. circe (Alexander, 1928)
D. circulans Alexander, 1953
D. compressior Alexander, 1952
D. costalis Brunetti, 1918
D. creon Alexander, 1970
D. cuneata Edwards, 1926
D. dactylophora Alexander, 1968
D. dira Alexander, 1937
D. euthystyla Alexander, 1968
D. evanida Alexander, 1932
D. extrudens Alexander, 1963
D. fabella Alexander, 1937
D. francki Alexander, 1932
D. fulvithorax Edwards, 1928
D. fumidapex Alexander, 1950
D. garuda Alexander, 1967
D. geniculata (Alexander, 1918)
D. gracilis de Meijere, 1911
D. guttulanalis Alexander, 1958
D. haightensis Alexander, 1931
D. himalayae Alexander, 1952
D. imitator Savchenko, 1979
D. incisuralis Alexander, 1940
D. infumata Edwards, 1933
D. infuscata Brunetti, 1912
D. inornatipes Alexander, 1932
D. insolida Alexander, 1934
D. jobiensis Alexander, 1948
D. kashongensis Alexander, 1967
D. kraussiana Alexander, 1971
D. kulingensis Alexander, 1937
D. laetipes Alexander, 1952
D. leucocnemis Alexander, 1940
D. linearis Edwards, 1932
D. lohfauensis Alexander, 1949
D. longisetosa Alexander, 1959
D. ludibunda Alexander, 1932
D. lugubrivestis Alexander, 1935
D. magnisternata Alexander, 1949
D. major (Edwards, 1926)
D. manipurensis Alexander, 1967
D. melanorhipis Alexander, 1970
D. melanosterna Alexander, 1931
D. microdonta Alexander, 1968
D. microphallus Alexander, 1963
D. multiguttula Alexander, 1931
D. nebulicola Alexander, 1934
D. neoballator Alexander, 1967
D. nigrofemorata Alexander, 1931
D. noctipennis Alexander, 1956
D. oberon (Alexander, 1930)
D. orchestes Alexander, 1963
D. orientalis Brunetti, 1912
D. palifera Alexander, 1958
D. pallidithorax de Meijere, 1914
D. parjanya Alexander, 1968
D. parvella Alexander, 1931
D. parvicornis (Alexander, 1927)
D. paucispinosa Alexander, 1931
D. pedicillata Alexander, 1968
D. penthema Alexander, 1963
D. perdita Alexander, 1932
D. perlongiseta Alexander, 1967
D. perpulchra (Edwards, 1926)
D. polysara Alexander, 1970
D. praesul Alexander, 1962
D. praesultator Alexander, 1948
D. productula Alexander, 1931
D. profundemarginata Alexander, 1935
D. pudibunda Alexander, 1932
D. quadrifila Alexander, 1931
D. queribunda Alexander, 1932
D. rahula Alexander, 1967
D. rantaizana (Alexander, 1929)
D. ridibunda Alexander, 1932
D. sandakanensis Edwards, 1931
D. schmidi Alexander, 1968
D. scotoptera Alexander, 1963
D. seticristata Alexander, 1969
D. setilobata Alexander, 1968
D. setisternata Alexander, 1931
D. simplex Alexander, 1967
D. simplicissima Alexander, 1968
D. singhalica Alexander, 1958
D. spinisternata Alexander, 1931
D. subalbitibia Alexander, 1956
D. subballator Alexander, 1967
D. subcuneata Alexander, 1934
D. subgeniculata Alexander, 1931
D. taiwania (Alexander, 1923)
D. tarsalba Alexander, 1930
D. tarsalis (Alexander, 1919)
D. thiasophila Alexander, 1963
D. thisbe Alexander, 1938
D. tinkhamiana Alexander, 1942
D. titania (Alexander, 1927)
D. toala Alexander, 1935
D. toraja Alexander, 1935
D. trichopyga (Alexander, 1928)
D. triguttata Edwards, 1933
D. tuberculifera Alexander, 1956
D. vitrea Edwards, 1932
D. vitripennis Alexander, 1956
D. volupta Alexander, 1963
D. vyasa Alexander, 1970
Subgenus Oropeza Needham, 1908
D. albitarsis (Brunetti, 1918)
D. australis Byers, 1961
D. barbigera (Savchenko, 1980)
D. bispinula (Alexander, 1929)
D. candidipes (Alexander, 1921)
D. carolus Alexander, 1940
D. dorsalis (Johnson, 1909)
D. fokiensis Alexander, 1938
D. inomatai Alexander, 1933
D. johnsonella (Alexander, 1931)
D. modesta (Savchenko, 1980)
D. obscura (Johnson, 1909)
D. polita (Johnson, 1909)
D. saitamensis Alexander, 1930
D. satsuma (Alexander, 1918)
D. sauteri (Riedel, 1917)
D. sayi (Johnson, 1909)
D. shirakiella (Alexander, 1926)
D. similis (Johnson, 1909)
D. subalbipes (Johnson, 1909)
D. subvenosa Alexander, 1940
D. tridenticulata Alexander, 1931
D. variitibiata Alexander, 1967
D. venosa (Johnson, 1909)
D. walleyi (Alexander, 1931)
Subgenus Prodolichopeza Alexander, 1963
D. ata Alexander, 1931
D. bilan Alexander, 1931
D. isolata Alexander, 1930
D. malagasya Karsch, 1886
Subgenus Sinoropeza Alexander, 1935
D. apicalis Liu & Yang, 2011
D. cuspidigera Liu & Yang, 2011
D. fasciventris Alexander, 1973
D. furcellatusa Liu & Yang, 2011
D. hamulifera Liu & Yang, 2011
D. multiseta Alexander, 1949
D. paucisetosa Alexander, 1937
D. pluricoma Alexander, 1935
D. postica Brunetti, 1912
Subgenus Trichodolichopeza Alexander, 1917
D. albogeniculata Alexander, 1921
D. altiarca Alexander, 1956
D. aurantiaca Alexander, 1921
D. barnardi Wood, 1952
D. byersiana Alexander, 1964
D. cathedralis Alexander, 1956
D. centrosoma Alexander, 1956
D. chaka Alexander, 1956
D. dingaan Alexander, 1960
D. dorsoprojecta Alexander, 1956
D. flavifrons Alexander, 1925
D. fluminis Wood, 1952
D. hirtipennis Alexander, 1917
D. insincera Alexander, 1946
D. nimbicosta Alexander, 1965
D. panda Alexander, 1958
D. parvistyla Alexander, 1956
D. peringueyi Alexander, 1925
D. picticeps Alexander, 1925
D. pyramidata Alexander, 1956
D. semiophora Alexander, 1960
D. senzangakona Alexander, 1960
D. sparsihirta Alexander, 1943
D. thoracica Alexander, 1925
D. vumbicola Alexander, 1946

References

Tipulidae